Leptuca uruguayensis, commonly known as the Uruguayan fiddler crab or the southwestern Atlantic fiddler crab, is a species of fiddler crab native to temperate and subtropical areas of the southeastern coast of South America.

Taxonomy

Previously a member of the genus Uca, the species was transferred in 2016 to the genus Leptuca when Leptuca was promoted from subgenus to genus level.

Description
Non-breeding males have a green carapace and red major cheliped; when breeding, the carapace of the male whitens. The major cheliped can remain red or also whiten.

Distribution
The crab is native to South America where its range includes Brazil, Uruguay, and Argentina.

Habitat
The species lives on silty sand or sandy silt soils with some organic matter. It prefers brackish and saline environments of moderate to high salinity.

References

Ocypodoidea
Crustaceans of the Atlantic Ocean
Crustaceans described in 1901